Maryland Route 802 (MD 802) is a state highway in the U.S. state of Maryland.  Known as Batts Neck Road, the state highway runs  as a north–south highway between junctions with MD 8 in Normans on Kent Island.  MD 802 is the old alignment of MD 8 through Normans.  The state highway was assigned after MD 8 was relocated by the early 1970s.

Route description

MD 802 begins at an intersection with MD 8 (Romancoke Road) in the unincorporated community of Normans north of Romancoke.  The state highway heads north as a narrow two-lane undivided road past residences in a forested area and intersects Batts Neck Road, an east–west county highway that provides access to the namesake peninsula.  MD 802 continues north to Matapeake Farm Lane, where the highway widens and turns west to its northern junction with MD 8 between Normans and Matapeake.

History
MD 802 is the original alignment of MD 8 through Normans.  The highway was constructed in 1938 as part of the Matapeake–Romancoke highway constructed to serve the newly inaugurated Romancoke–Claiborne ferry across Eastern Bay.  This highway became a western extension of MD 17, which originally ran from Claiborne to Easton, in 1939.  The number changed to MD 33 when MD 33 and MD 17 swapped numbers in 1940.  The highway's number changed again when MD 8 replaced MD 33 on Kent Island in 1960.  MD 802 was assigned to its current length after MD 8 was relocated through Normans by 1973.

Junction list

See also

References

External links

MDRoads: MD 802

802
Maryland Route 802